The Arboretum de Villardebelle (6 hectares) is an arboretum specializing in conifers located in Villardebelle, Aude, Languedoc-Roussillon, France.

The arboretum was established in 1994 on four locations across hilly terrain at an altitude of 510 to 670 meters, with stated aims including conservation of endangered species, scientific study and experimentation, education, environmental protection against erosion, and aesthetics. It is technically a pinetum because mainly dedicated to conifers.

Specimens
The site's natural vegetation includes: 
 
  Acer monspessulanum
  Buxus sempervirens
  Corylus avellana
  Crataegus monogyna
  Cupressus sempervirens
  Fraxinus excelsior
  Genista spp.
  Ilex aquifolium
  Juniperus communis
  Prunus avium
  Prunus spinosa
  Pteridium aquilinum
  Quercus ilex

Timber plantings in the region include: 
 
  Cedrus atlantica
  Fagus sylvatica
  Picea sitchensis
  Pinus nigra laricio or calabrica
  Pinus sylvestris
  Pseudotsuga menziesii
  Quercus

Since 1994 the arboretum has planted over 3500 specimens, mainly from seeds, including more than 190 Gymnosperm species and subspecies. A further hundred species are being cultivated in the arboretum's nursery. 
Some specimens of interest include:
 
  Araucaria araucana
  Calocedrus decurrens
  Calocedrus formosana
  Cedrus atlantica
  Cupressus dupreziana
  Cupressus torulosa
  Cupressus chengiana
  Taiwania cryptomerioides
  Juniperus occidentalis
  Juniperus thurifera
  Juniperus deppeana
  Metasequoia glyptostroboides
  Picea chihuahuana
  Pinus attenuata
  Pinus coulteri
  Pinus ponderosa
  Platycladus orientalis
  Prumnopitys andina
  Sequoia sempervirens
  Thujopsis dolabrata
  Tetraclinis articulata

See also 
 List of botanical gardens in France

References

External links
 Official Website of Arboretum de Villardebelle

Villardebelle, Arboretum de
Villardebelle, Arboretum de